Dan Kennedy is a Republican member of the Montana Legislature.  He was elected to House District 57 which represents a portion of the Billings area.

References

External links
Home page

Year of birth missing (living people)
Living people
Republican Party members of the Montana House of Representatives
Politicians from Billings, Montana
Place of birth missing (living people)